The 1929 U.S. Open was the 33rd U.S. Open, held June 27–30 at Winged Foot Golf Club in Mamaroneck, New York, a suburb northeast of New York City. Bobby Jones won his third U.S. Open title in a 36-hole playoff, besting Al Espinosa by 23 strokes on the West Course.

Jones opened with a 69 in the first round to grab the lead, then followed with a 75.

After a third round 71, he had a three-stroke lead over Gene Sarazen and was four clear of Espinosa after 54 holes. Sarazen fell out of contention in the final round with a 78 and fell to a tie for third place. Espinosa shot a 75 and a 294 total, but it appeared like it would not be enough to overtake Jones. Beginning with the 15th, Jones needed only three bogeys and a par to win the championship. However, he triple-bogeyed the 15th and then made another bogey on 16 and his lead was gone. He made par at the 17th, but his approach on the 18th found a greenside bunker. Needing to get up-and-down to save par and force a playoff, Jones rolled in a  putt for the tie.

Jones dominated the 36-hole playoff on Sunday, with a 72 in the morning round to grab a 12-shot lead. Espinosa struggled again on the second 18, shooting an 80 to Jones' 69, and Jones won the playoff by 23 shots. He won his fourth U.S. Open in 1930 and the grand slam.  The 23-stroke win is the largest margin of victory in a major golf tournament playoff.

Originally scheduled to be played over the East Course at Winged Foot, storm damaged caused the championship to be relocated to the West Course. It was the first of six U.S. Opens to be held on Winged Foot's West Course; it later hosted in 1959, 1974, 1984, 2006, and 2020; it also hosted the PGA Championship in 1997.

Course layout
West Course

Past champions in the field

Made the cut 

Source:

Missed the cut 

Source:

Round summaries

First round
Thursday, June 27, 1929

Source:

Second round
Friday, June 28, 1929

Source:

Third round
Saturday, June 29, 1929 (morning)

Source:

Final round
Saturday, June 29, 1929 (afternoon)

Source:
(a) denotes amateur

Scorecard
Final round

Cumulative tournament scores, relative to par
Source:

Playoff 
Sunday, June 30, 1929

Source:

Scorecards
Morning round

Afternoon round

Cumulative playoff scores, relative to par
{|class="wikitable" span = 50 style="font-size:85%;
|-
|style="background: Pink;" width=10|
|Birdie
|style="background: PaleGreen;" width=10|
|Bogey
|style="background: Green;" width=10|
|Double bogey
|style="background: Olive;" width=10|
|Triple bogey+
|}
Source:

References

External links
USGA Championship Database
USOpen.com – 1929

U.S. Open (golf)
Golf in New York (state)
Mamaroneck, New York
U.S. Open
U.S. Open
U.S. Open
June 1929 sports events